The Cretan shrew (Crocidura zimmermanni) is a species of mammal in the family Soricidae. It is endemic to the island of Crete, Greece.  Its natural habitat is temperate shrubland, and the animal is threatened by habitat loss.  It is found in the mountainous highlands of Crete, having been displaced from lower altitudes by the lesser white-toothed shrew (Crocidura suaveolens).

It may be a descendant of the extinct Crocidura kornfeldi, the first Crocidura shrew to colonize Europe, which was distributed throughout central and southern Europe during the Pliocene and Pleistocene.

References

Crocidura
Endemic fauna of Greece
Endemic fauna of Crete
Crete
Mammals of Europe
Vulnerable animals
Vulnerable biota of Europe
Mammals described in 1953
Taxonomy articles created by Polbot